Pietro Linari (15 October 1896 – 1 January 1972) was an Italian cyclist. He finished in fourth place in the 1925 Paris–Roubaix.

References

1896 births
1972 deaths
Italian Giro d'Italia stage winners
Italian male cyclists
Cyclists from Florence